Jadwiga Jankowska-Cieślak (born 15 February 1951) is a Polish film actress. She has appeared in 33 films since 1972. She won the award for Best Actress at the 1982 Cannes Film Festival for her role in the film Another Way.

On 4 December 2007, she was awarded the Knight's Cross of the Order of Polonia Restituta for her outstanding contribution to the  work for democratic change in Poland, for her commitment to the fight for freedom of expression and free media, for achievements undertaken for the benefit of the country and social work. The decoration ceremony was held on 10 December 2007 in the Concert Studio of Polish Radio. On 5 October 2009, she received the Gold Medal of Gloria Artis.

Selected filmography
 Another Way (1982)
 Scratch (2008)
 Sweet Rush (2009)

References

External links
 

1951 births
20th-century Polish actresses
21st-century Polish actresses
Living people
Polish film actresses
Polish stage actresses
Actresses from Gdańsk
Cannes Film Festival Award for Best Actress winners
Knights of the Order of Polonia Restituta
Recipients of the Gold Medal for Merit to Culture – Gloria Artis